Molybdurga is a genus of moths of the  family Heliodinidae.  There is only one species in this genus: Molybdurga metallophora Meyrick, 1897 that is found in Australia.

References
Meyrick, 1897 . Proc. Linn. Soc. N.S.W. 22 : 298, 369
www.nhm.ac.uk Genus Data base
Atlas of Living Australia

Heliodinidae